"No One Does It Better" is the third single from You Me at Six's third studio album Sinners Never Sleep. The single was released on 8 April 2012 as a digital download in the United Kingdom. The single reached No. 92 on the UK Singles Chart, making it the band's ninth top 100 single. Its comparably low chart position could be attributed to another much higher charting single, The Swarm (No. 23), being released during the weeks leading up to the single's release, overshadowing the release of "No One Does It Better".

Music video
A music video to accompany the release of "No One Does It Better" was first released onto YouTube on 5 March 2012 at a total length of four minutes and eighteen seconds.

Track listing

Chart performance

Release history

References

2012 singles
You Me at Six songs
2011 songs
Virgin Records singles
Songs written by Josh Franceschi